John Bradley "Bill" Streit (December 18, 1892 – June 30, 1978) was a college football player.

Early years
John Bradley Streit was born on December 18, 1892 in Birmingham, Alabama, the son of a prominent builder. "He grew up in the give-and-take life of a family of nine."

College football

Auburn
Streit competed in football, basketball, baseball, and track at Auburn University. He was a prominent fullback for the Auburn Tigers from 1909 to 1910.

1910
Streit led the school in touchdowns in 1910. He was a unanimous All-Southern player. Early in the season both Streit and Kirk Newell were injured. In the 26 to 0 victory over the Georgia Bulldogs, Streit scored two touchdowns. Streit assisted coaching the 1911 team.

Princeton
He then transferred to Princeton University and played for the Princeton Tigers football team from 1913 to 1915.

1913
In the 1913 game with Fordham he scored four touchdowns and four extra points in a 69 to 0 victory, setting a school record for points by an individual in a game (28) which stood until 1967.

References

All-Southern college football players
Players of American football from Birmingham, Alabama
Auburn Tigers football players
Auburn Tigers football coaches
American football fullbacks
Sportspeople from Birmingham, Alabama
1892 births
1978 deaths
Princeton Tigers football players